Uthukadu  is a small village in Walajabad panchayat union, Kanchipuram district, Tamil Nadu, India. Tamil Nadu state highway 48 is passing through Uthukadu village. Uthukadu is  distance from its Walajabad town,  distance from its district main city Kanchipuram and  distance from its state main city Chennai.

Festivals in Uthukadu 
There are many temples in Uthukadu. Carnivals are celebrated for each temple in different periods.

List of popularly known temple are below. 
 Ellamman Temple
 Perumal Temple
 Veera Anjanayar Temple
 Many Vinayakar Temple
 Mahalingeswarar Temple
 Periyandavar Temple
 Ponniyamman Temple
 Arumugam (Murugan Temple)
 Porpandi Isvaran and many more.
 Poth Raja Temple
 Jestha Devi

Arulmigu Sri Periyandavar Temple Pictures

Arulmigu Sri Ellamman Temple Pictures 

Streets:

[Ellai Amman Temple] Chetty street,
Bhramanar street,
Nadu Street,
Pillayar street,
Palla street,
Kuyavar Street.

School 
Panchayat Union School is established by 1968s. Then the school got certification and the name is converted into High School.

Profession 
Most of the village people are land lards and Milk Business. Agriculture is the main day to day work for the village people. But nowadays the agriculture is drastically coming down and real estate business is dominating in the people mind.

Religions 
95% of the village peoples are Hindu.

Villages & Towns Near By Uthukadu Ellamman

Colleges near by Nathanallur 
 Lord Venkateswaraa Engineering College, Puliambakkam
 Adhi College of Engineering and Technology, Sankarapuram
 Esenes Institute of Teacher Education, Walajabad
 Cholan Teacher Training Institute, Sambarambakkam
 Amirtham Institute of Management Studies, Walajabad

Residential Projects 
  Inno GeoCity, Thenneri

References 

 Uthukadu location in wikimapia

Villages in Kanchipuram district